Pattanakke Banda Pathniyaru is a 1980 Indian Kannada-language film, directed by A. V. Sheshagiri Rao and produced by S. D. Ankalagi, B. H. Chandannanawar, M. G. Hublikar and Surendra Ingle. The film stars Srinath, Manjula, Lokesh and Padmapriya. The film has musical score by M. Ranga Rao. The movie was remade in 1982 in Telugu as Patnam Vachina Pativrathalu. The song Shankara Gangadhara was retained in the Telugu version. The film was also remade in Tamil as Pattanamthaan Pogalaamadi (1990).

Cast

 Srinath
 Manjula
 Lokesh
 Padmapriya
 T. N. Balakrishna
 Vajramuni
 Dinesh
 Tiger Prabhakar
 R. N. Hoogar
 Sadashiva Brahmavar
 B. K. Shankar
 Uma Shivakumar
 Pramila Joshai
 Halam
 B. H. Chandannavar in guest appearance
 Surendra Ingale in guest appearance

Soundtrack
The music was composed by M. Ranga Rao.

References

External links
 
 

1980s Kannada-language films
Films scored by M. Ranga Rao
Indian comedy-drama films
Kannada films remade in other languages
Films directed by A. V. Seshagiri Rao
1980 comedy-drama films
1980 films